Route 381 is a provincial highway located in the Capitale-Nationale and Saguenay–Lac-Saint-Jean regions of Quebec. It runs from Baie-Saint-Paul (in Charlevoix) at the junction of Route 138 and ends in the La Baie sector of the City of Saguenay at the junction of Route 170.

Towns located along Route 381

 Baie-Saint-Paul
 Saint-Urbain
 Lac-Pikauba
 Ferland-et-Boilleau
 Saguenay

See also

 List of Quebec provincial highways

References

External links 
 Transports Quebec Official Map 
 Route 381 on Google Maps

381
Roads in Capitale-Nationale
Roads in Saguenay–Lac-Saint-Jean
Baie-Saint-Paul
Transport in Saguenay, Quebec